Jesper Jens Joakim Skalberg Karlsson (born 18 June 1993) is a Swedish politician of the Moderate Party. He was Member of the Riksdag from January 2015 to September 2018, representing his home constituency Gotland County. He replaced Gustaf Hoffstedt who resigned his seat. He is also Baby of the House since taking office, replacing Dennis Dioukarev who is only 3 months older. He regained his seat in the 2022 general election.

In the Riksdag, Skalberg Karlsson was a deputy member of the Committee on Environment and Agriculture from January 2015 and a deputy member of the Committee on European Union Affairs from November 2015.

References 

People from Gotland
1993 births
Living people
Members of the Riksdag 2014–2018
Members of the Riksdag 2018–2022
Members of the Riksdag 2022–2026
21st-century Swedish politicians
Members of the Riksdag from the Moderate Party